Leaghur State Park is a  state park approximately  south-west of Kerang, in Victoria, Australia.  The Park protects some of the most significant Black Box (Eucalyptus largiflorens) wetlands and woodlands in Victoria. The Park is part of the Loddon River floodplain and is frequently flooded, creating ephemeral wetlands and different age classes in the Black Box stands. It was opened in 1992.

References

State parks of Victoria (Australia)
Protected areas established in 1992